Zech is both a given name and a German surname. Most commonly found in Germany, from 2014 data there are approximately 13,000 people with currently with the surname, and about 2,000 of those being in the United States.

Origin 
Nickname from Middle High German zæhe, zæch ‘tenacious’.

Early Origins 
The surname Zech was first found in Silesia, where the name was closely identified in early medieval times with the feudal society which would become prominent throughout European history. The name would later be associated with noble family with great influence, having many distinguished branches, and become noted for its involvement in social, economic and political affairs.

Zech Settlers in United States in the 18th Century 

 Jacob Zech, who arrived in Pennsylvania in 1751

Notable people with the name include 

Harry Zech (born 1969), Liechtenstein footballer
Julius August Christoph Zech (1821–1864), German astronomer
Reinhold Zech (born 1948), German footballer
Rosel Zech (1942–2011), German actress
Tobias Josef Zech (born 1981), German politician
Zech/Zach Strumsky (born 1999), American Musician and internet personality
Zech Pluister (born 1994), vocalist of American pop punk band Sleep On It.

References

German-language surnames